Roseworthy is a small town in South Australia, about 10 km north of Gawler on the Horrocks Highway. At the 2016 census, Roseworthy had a population of 994.

Roseworthy has a large grain storage facility consisting of both storage silos and bunkers for grain grown in the surrounding areas, and grain is now taken by road transport to Port Adelaide for export where it was once taken by rail. Roseworthy is the junction of the former Peterborough railway line and Morgan railway lines, both constructed as broad gauge railway lines (although the Peterborough line was originally narrow gauge from Terowie to Peterborough), and remained that gauge for their entire service. Both lines were originally built to support export from copper mines, respectively at Burra and Kapunda before being extended beyond those towns. The railways later served primarily to carry grain to port instead of copper, but have now been supplanted by road transport.

The Roseworthy campus of the University of Adelaide is the location of Australia's newest Vet School. The School of Animal & Veterinary Sciences provides education and training of animal and veterinary scientists in a research environment. The School offers three academic programs: Animal Science, Veterinary Bioscience and Doctor of Veterinary Medicine (DVM).

Roseworthy is a popular stop for many truck drivers with the Roseworthy Roadhouse often bustling with resting travellers and transport drivers as they traverse along the Horrocks Highway.

Roseworthy is in the Light Regional Council, the state electoral district of Schubert and the federal divisions of Barker and Grey.

History
The Surveyor General of South Australia visited the site which would become Roseworthy on 13 December 1837. In 1855 land in the Hundred of Mudla Wirra was purchased by William and Grace Gartrell. In 1863 when William died Grace sub-divided the land and named it Roseworthy.

Notes and references

Towns in South Australia